Nicholas John Bosa (born October 23, 1997) is an American football defensive end for the San Francisco 49ers of the National Football League (NFL). He played college football at Ohio State and was selected second overall by the 49ers in the 2019 NFL Draft. Bosa was named NFL Defensive Rookie of the Year by having nine sacks in the regular season and helping his team reach Super Bowl LIV. In 2022 he won the NFL Defensive Player of the Year award. He is the son of former NFL defensive end John Bosa and younger brother of Joey, currently a linebacker for the Los Angeles Chargers.

Early years
Bosa attended St. Thomas Aquinas in Fort Lauderdale, Florida where he was a four-year starter and a multi-year first-team all-state player. He was a five-star recruit and was ranked among the best players in his class. He committed to Ohio State University to play college football.

College career

Bosa played in all 13 games as a true freshman at Ohio State in 2016, recording 29 tackles, seven of which were for a loss, and five sacks.

In his sophomore year, he became the starting defensive end for the Buckeyes in seven games. Bosa was named a unanimous First-team All-Big Ten and the Smith-Brown Big Ten Defensive Lineman of the Year for his 32 total tackles (14.5 for a loss) and a team leading seven sacks. Additionally, he had two pass breakups, eight quarterback hurries and a blocked kick.

On September 20, 2018, it was reported that Bosa underwent core muscle surgery, ruling him out indefinitely. On October 16, Bosa announced that he was withdrawing from Ohio State for the rest of the season. After the season, Bosa decided to forgo his senior year and enter the 2019 NFL Draft.

College statistics

Professional career
Coming out of Ohio State, Bosa was projected to be the first overall pick in the draft by a majority of analysts and scouts. Bosa received an invitation to the NFL Scouting Combine as one of the top prospects at the draft. He completed all of the required combine drills and positional drills except for the 10 yard and 20 yard split. Bosa met and interviewed with 8 NFL teams at the combine, including the Arizona Cardinals, San Francisco 49ers, New York Jets, New York Giants, and Tampa Bay Buccaneers. A week before the draft, Bosa was criticized by some due to his political beliefs and controversial tweets, such as calling Colin Kaepernick a "clown", expressing support for US president Donald Trump, and "liking" a post on Instagram that included racial and homophobic slurs as hashtags.

Bosa was not seen as the projected 1st pick anymore after Heisman Winner Kyler Murray NFL Draft Combine measurements were excellent . Bosa was selected by the San Francisco 49ers in the first round with the second overall pick in the 2019 NFL Draft.

2019 season

On July 25, 2019, Bosa signed a 4-year deal with the 49ers worth $33.5 million featuring a $22.5 million signing bonus and a fifth year option.

Bosa made his NFL debut in Week 1 against the Tampa Bay Buccaneers. In the game, he made 3 tackles and sacked quarterback Jameis Winston once in the 31–17 road victory.
During a Week 5 31–3 victory over the Cleveland Browns, Bosa sacked Baker Mayfield twice, one of which resulted in a fumble, earning him NFC Defensive Player of the Week. In the next game against the Carolina Panthers, Bosa sacked Kyle Allen thrice and recorded his first career interception in the 51–13 win. He was named the NFC Defensive Player of the Week for his performance along with his brother Joey, who was voted AFC Defensive Player of the Week. The next day, Bosa was named the NFC Defensive Player of the Month for his play in October.

Bosa finished his rookie year with 47 tackles, nine sacks, a forced fumble, two fumble recoveries, two pass deflections, and an interception in 16 games and 14 starts. In the Divisional Round of the playoffs against the Minnesota Vikings, Bosa sacked Kirk Cousins twice during the 27–10 win. In the NFC Championship Game against the Packers, Bosa sacked Aaron Rodgers once in the 37–20 win. At the NFL Honors, Bosa won the AP NFL Defensive Rookie of the Year Award, which his father accepted on his behalf due to Bosa being at the Super Bowl in Miami. In Super Bowl LIV against the Kansas City Chiefs, he recorded a strip sack on Patrick Mahomes during the 31–20 loss.

2020 season
During Week 2 against the New York Jets, Bosa suffered a torn ACL and was ruled out for the rest of the season. He was placed on injured reserve on September 23, 2020. During Bosa's rehab, he hired a private chef and took on a strict, protein-heavy diet as part of his recovery.

2021 season
Bosa made his return to the field during Week 1 on September 12. He had 4 solo tackles, 3 tackles for loss, and sacked Jared Goff once during the game. During Week 11 against the Jacksonville Jaguars, he got his tenth sack of the season, breaking his rookie-season sack total of nine. Bosa finished the season with 15.5 sacks, the fourth most in the league.

2022 season
On April 25, 2022, the 49ers picked up the fifth-year option on Bosa's rookie contract. On December 1, Bosa was announced by the NFL as the NFC Defensive Player of the Month for the month of November. In three games in November, he recorded five tackles for a loss, three sacks, and 10 quarterback hits, with the 49ers going 3–0 during that span. In Week 13, Bosa had three sacks, two tackles for loss, and a forced fumble in a 33–17 win over the Dolphins, earning NFC Defensive Player of the Week. In Week 16, he had seven tackles, two sacks, and a forced fumble in a 37–20 win over the Washington Commanders, earning his second NFC Defensive Player of the Week honor of the season. Bosa led the league in sacks during the regular season, recording 18.5 sacks for 138 yards in 16 games. At the conclusion of the season Bosa was named the league's Defensive Player of the Year.

NFL career statistics

Regular season

Postseason

Personal life

His brother, Joey Bosa, also played college football at Ohio State before being selected third overall by the San Diego Chargers in the 2016 NFL Draft. Their father, John Bosa, was a first round pick by the Miami Dolphins in the 1987 NFL Draft out of Boston College. His uncle Eric Kumerow, and cousin Jake Kumerow, have also played in the NFL. His grand-uncle, Mike Pyle, also played in the NFL. He is the great-grandson of former Chicago Outfit leader Tony Accardo.

References

External links

 

Ohio State Buckeyes bio
San Francisco 49ers bio

1997 births
Living people
Players of American football from Fort Lauderdale, Florida
American football defensive ends
Ohio State Buckeyes football players
San Francisco 49ers players
American people of Italian descent
St. Thomas Aquinas High School (Florida) alumni
National Football League Defensive Rookie of the Year Award winners
National Conference Pro Bowl players
National Football League Defensive Player of the Year Award winners